Mbumbuni is a community in Makueni County, Kenya. It is located approximately 140 km from Nairobi. It hosts several primary and secondary schools, including Kitondo Secondary School.

Mbumbuni was formerly the headquarters for Mbooni East District of the now-defunct Eastern Province.

References 

Populated places in Eastern Province (Kenya)
Makueni County